Portrait of the Artist's Mother may refer to:

Portrait of the Artist's Mother (Van Gogh)
Portrait of the Artist's Mother at the Age of 63, by Albrecht Dürer

See also
Whistler's Mother
Portrait of the Artist's Family (disambiguation)